The New Revolution is the third album released by the American rapper Layzie Bone, released in the United States on August 22, 2006.

Track listing

External links

2006 albums
Layzie Bone albums
Gangsta rap albums by American artists